The RWJBarnabas Health Arena (formerly known as the Ritacco Center, the Poland Spring Arena, and then Pine Belt Arena) is a 3,208-seat multi-purpose arena in Toms River, New Jersey.  It opened in 2003. It hosts various local concerts and sporting events for the area.

The arena is used for high school basketball, being home to the Toms River North Mariners's basketball teams as well as teams from other high schools in Toms River.  The arena can seat 3,208 for basketball and 3,500 for concerts.

For trade shows, RJW Barnabas Healthcare Arena has  of space.  It is also used for graduation ceremonies.

Starting in January 2018, the name was officially changed to the "RWJBarnabas Health Arena" after the district signed a five-year deal with RWJBarnabas Health under which the district will be paid a total of $637,500 for the naming rights.

More information
The venue is a public arena connected to the Toms River High School North. It is the centerpiece of the Toms River Regional School District. It opened 19 June 2004, and is situated on the grounds of the school. The facility is used by the high school and the school district for many functions, including the inaugural senior graduation at that location by the Class of 2004, and is also used major concert events throughout the year to raise money for the school district.

Its biggest musical performances (some as part of Toms River Fest) include Miranda Sings, Maroon 5, Kelly Clarkson, Vanessa Carlton, The Beach Boys, Frankie Valli, Daughtry, The Four Seasons, Kenny Rogers and The Moody Blues.

The building was originally named The Ritacco Center, after Michael Ritacco, the then superintendent of Toms River Regional Schools, with Poland Spring coming on board as a major sponsor shortly afterwards. In the wake of the bribery scandal that culminated in Ritacco's arrest by the FBI on 21 October 2010 and his retirement the same day, the school district quickly acted to erase his name from the building and call it the Poland Spring Arena instead. The Ritacco Center name was covered with tarps be 26 October 2010, the use of the name was discontinued elsewhere including the website and exterior signage was permanently removed on 17 October 2011.

In July 2011, the school district announced a new name sponsor for the venue. The Pine Belt Auto Group signed a $500,000 contract for the naming rights for five years.

During the building of the Pine Belt Arena, additional wings, a cafeteria, and a library were added onto the school. These additions helped limit overpopulation of the school. They also allowed freshmen to have their own wing so they could easily adjust to the high school.

References

External links
 Official website

Indoor arenas in New Jersey
Toms River, New Jersey
Sports venues in New Jersey
Buildings and structures in Ocean County, New Jersey
2003 establishments in New Jersey
Sports venues completed in 2003
Basketball venues in New Jersey